Gymnopilus purpuratus is a species of agaric fungus in the family Hymenogastraceae. It grows in clusters on dead wood, tree stumps and wood chip mulch. It is widely distributed and has been recorded in Argentina, Australia, Chile, New Zealand, the UK and Germany. It has a broadly convex cap covered in small dry reddish-brown scales, a stout yellow stem beneath reddish brown, wine-red to purple vertical fibres, and a thick rusty orange spore print.

The mushroom stains greenish, blue and purple when damaged, and is psychoactive. A chemical analysis carried out by Jochen Gartz in 1993 found that this species contains 0.34% psilocybin, 0.29% psilocin and 0.05% baeocystin.

Description

The cap ranges from 1.5 to 6 cm across, is convex to obtuse, and is reddish brown with a dry scaly surface which is sometimes cracked in age.  The stem is brown-red and covered by fibers and has blue-green spots where the stem is damaged.  The gills are crowded, yellow to orange, and adnexed.  The stem is dusted with rusty orange spores and has a cottony scanty partial veil.

See also

List of Gymnopilus species
List of psilocybin mushrooms

References

 Mushroom Observer: Name: Gymnopilus purpuratus (Cooke & Massee) Singer
 Hesler, L. R. (1969). North American species of Gymnopilus. New York: Hafner. 117 pp.

External links

 Gymnopilus purpuratus chemical analysis
 Painting of Cooke's type specimen, Agaricus purpuratus, collected in Kew Gardens; in his Illustrations of British Fungi (Hymenomycetes), to serve as an atlas to the "Handbook of British Fungi", vol. 8 - Biodiversity Heritage Library

purpuratus
Psychoactive fungi
Psychedelic tryptamine carriers
Fungi of Australia
Fungi of Europe
Fungi of South America
Fungi of New Zealand
Fungi described in 1890